This is a list of episodes from the ninth season of Real Time with Bill Maher.

Episodes

External links 
 Real Time with Bill Maher Free (audio-only) episodes and Overtime podcast direct from HBO
 HBO.com Episode List
 TV.com Episode Guide
 

Real Time with Bill Maher
Real Time with Bill Maher seasons